Tobipuranga ybyra is a species of beetle in the family Cerambycidae. It was described by Napp and Martins in 1996.

References

Heteropsini
Beetles described in 1996